The following is a list of players, both past and current, who appeared at least in one game for the Miami Marlins franchise, known as the Florida Marlins from their inception in 1993 through the 2011 season.

Players in bold are members of the National Baseball Hall of Fame and Museum.



A

Jeff Abbott
Kurt Abbott
Reggie Abercrombie
Juan Acevedo
Joel Adamson
Chris Aguila
Antonio Alfonseca
Chad Allen
Armando Almanza
Héctor Almonte
Moisés Alou
Henderson Álvarez
Juan Alvarez
Steve Ames
Alfredo Amézaga
Robert Andino
Luis Aquino
Oswaldo Arcia
Alex Arias
Jack Armstrong
Bruce Aven
Luis Ayala
Manny Aybar

B

Burke Badenhop
Benito Báez
Jeff Baker
John Baker
Paul Bako
Willie Banks
Brian Banks
Bret Barberie
Brian Barden
Daniel Barone
Kyle Barraclough
Manuel Barrios
Miguel Batista
Danny Bautista
Yorman Bazardo
Josh Beckett
Heath Bell
Duane Below
Armando Benítez
Chad Bentz
Dave Berg
Gerónimo Berroa
Brent Billingsley
Ricky Bones
Emilio Bonifacio
Bobby Bonilla
Aaron Boone
Josh Booty
Joe Borchard
Toby Borland
Joe Borowski
Justin Bour
Ryan Bowen
Rob Brantly
Craig Breslow
Austin Brice
Reid Brignac
Greg Briley
Jerry Brooks
Brant Brown
Jordan Brown
Kevin Brown
Jerry Browne
John Buck
Mark Buehrle
Jay Buente
Nate Bump
John Burkett
A. J. Burnett
Homer Bush

C

Miguel Cabrera
Kiko Calero
Mike Cameron
Arquimedes Caminero
John Cangelosi
Jorge Cantú
Carter Capps
Cris Carpenter
Chuck Carr
Matías Carrillo
Brett Carroll
Marcos Carvajal
Andrew Cashner
Frank Castillo
Luis Castillo
Ramón Castro
José Ceda
Matt Cepicky
Hunter Cervenka
Wei-Yin Chen
Randy Choate
Hee-Seop Choi
Steven Cishek
Chris Clapinski
Paul Clemens
Matt Clement
Chris Coghlan
Greg Colbrunn
Jeff Conine
Adam Conley
Dennis Cook
Archie Corbin
Wil Cordero
Erik Cordier
Reid Cornelius
Jim Corsi
Jarred Cosart
Henry Cotto
Craig Counsell
Scott Cousins
Jim Crowell

D

Vic Darensbourg
Brian Daubach
Darren Daulton
David Davidson
Brad Davis
Andre Dawson
Alejandro De Aza
Eulogio De La Cruz
Valerio de los Santos
Steve Decker
Jesús Delgado
Carlos Delgado
Ryan Dempster
Anthony DeSclafani
Orestes Destrade
Mario Díaz
Matt Diaz
Derek Dietrich
Corey Dickerson
Joe Dillon
Greg Dobbs
Matt Dominguez
Brendan Donnelly
Brian Drahman
Matt Dunbar
Michael Dunn
Todd Dunwoody
Sam Dyson

E

Damion Easley
Brian Edmondson
Cody Ege
Jim Eisenreich
Brian Ellington
Juan Encarnación
Nathan Eovaldi
Jake Esch
Carl Everett

F

Jorge Fábregas
Monty Fariss
Junior Félix
Alex Fernández
José Fernández
Nate Field
Cliff Floyd
Brian Flynn
Joe Fontenot
Andy Fox
Chad Fox
Willie Fraser
Rafael Furcal
Jeff Fulchino

G

John Gall
Rich Garcés
Amaury García
Guillermo Garcia
Harvey García
Jarlin García
José García
Lee Gardner
Mark Gardner
Chad Gaudin
Franklyn Germán
Cole Gillespie
Ross Gload
Álex González
Andy González
Gabe González
Luis Gonzalez
Dee Gordon
Franklyn Gracesqui
Craig Grebeck
Nick Green
Adam Greenberg
Kevin Gregg
Tommy Gregg
Jason Grilli
Buddy Groom
Mike Gulan

H

Cody Hall
Chris Hammond
Brad Hand
Dan Haren
Lenny Harris
Bryan Harvey
Chris Hatcher
Brett Hayes
Andrew Heaney
Adeiny Hechavarria
Rick Helling
Wes Helms
Mark Hendrickson
Oscar Henríquez
Clay Hensley
Félix Heredia
Matt Herges
Jeremy Hermida
Enrique Hernández
Gorkys Hernández
Jeremy Hernandez
Liván Hernández
Koyie Hill
Trevor Hoffman
Todd Hollandsworth
Paul Hoover
Charlie Hough
James Houser
Ben Howard
Bill Hurst
Mark Hutton
Tim Hyers

I
Omar Infante
Hansel Izquierdo

J

Edwin Jackson
Ryan Jackson
Mike Jacobs
Mike Jeffcoat
Dan Jennings
Charles Johnson
Chris Johnson
Josh Johnson
Nick Johnson
Reed Johnson
John Johnstone
Garrett Jones
Hunter Jones
Jacque Jones
Todd Jones
Ryan Jorgensen
Jorge Julio

K

Austin Kearns
 Don Kelly
Logan Kensing
Byung-hyun Kim
Joe Klink
Randy Knorr
Gary Knotts
Billy Koch
Tom Koehler
John Koronka
Casey Kotchman
Mark Kotsay

L

Mike Lamb
Andy Larkin
Mat Latos
Raudel Lazo
Wade LeBlanc
Carlos Lee
Derrek Lee
Al Leiter
Chris Leroux
Allen Levrault
Richie Lewis
Todd Linden
Matt Lindstrom
Graeme Lloyd
Jeff Locke
Paul Lo Duca
Braden Looper
José López
Mendy López
Mike Lowell
Ed Lucas
Eric Ludwick
Héctor Luna
Mitch Lyden

M

John Mabry
Dave Magadan
Ron Mahay
Joe Mahoney
John Maine
Oswaldo Mairena
Marty Malloy
Matt Mantei
Josías Manzanillo
Jhan Mariñez
Jake Marisnick
Carlos Mármol
Carlos Martinez
Cristhian Martínez
Osvaldo Martínez
Sandy Martínez
Nick Masset
Terry Mathews
Jeff Mathis
Kevin Mattison
Cameron Maybin
Vin Mazzaro
Bob McClure
Casey McGehee
Scott McGough
Dustin McGowan
Terry McGriff
Ryan McGuire
Billy McMillon
Dallas McPherson
Brian Meadows
Jim Mecir
Rafael Medina
Adalberto Méndez
Randy Messenger
Dan Meyer
Dan Miceli
Kevin Millar
Andrew Miller
Jai Miller
Justin Miller
Kurt Miller
Ralph Milliard
Sergio Mitre
Brian Moehler
Tyler Moore
Mike Mordecai
Russ Morman
Logan Morrison
Guillermo Mota
Chad Mottola
Lyle Mouton
Edward Mujica
Donnie Murphy
Rob Murphy
Jeff Mutis
Mike Myers

N

Chris Narveson
Bob Natal
Blaine Neal
Joe Nelson
Robb Nen
Mike Neu
Justin Nicolino
Ricky Nolasco
Abraham Núñez
Leo Núñez
Vladimir Núñez

O

Greg O'Halloran
Wes Obermueller
Nefi Ogando
Will Ohman
Kirt Ojala
Darren Oliver
Miguel Olivo
Edgar Olmos
Kevin Olsen
Scott Olsen
Kevin Orie
Joe Orsulak
Henry Owens
Eric Owens
Marcell Ozuna
Pablo Ozuna

P

Donn Pall
Ronny Paulino
Carl Pavano
Alejandro Peña
Terry Pendleton
Hayden Penn
Brad Penny
Yefri Perez
Yorkis Pérez
Matt Perisho
Bryan Petersen
Yusmeiro Petit
 David Phelps
Tommy Phelps
Zach Phillips
Mike Piazza
Juan Pierre
Renyel Pinto
Plácido Polanco
Gus Polidor
Scott Pose
Jay Powell
Martín Prado

Q
Chad Qualls
Paul Quantrill

R

Mike Rabelo
Tim Raines
Erasmo Ramirez
Hanley Ramírez
Julio Ramirez
AJ Ramos
Pat Rapp
Jon Rauch
Colin Rea
J. T. Realmuto
Mark Redman
Mike Redmond
Eric Reed
Édgar Rentería
Rick Renteria
Chris Resop
Jo-Jo Reyes
Jose Reyes
Arthur Rhodes
J. T. Riddle
John Riedling
Mike Rivera
Nate Robertson
Fernando Rodney
Iván Rodríguez
Henry Rodríguez
Henry Rodríguez
Rich Rodríguez
Nate Rolison
Sandy Rosario
John Roskos
Cody Ross
Vinny Rottino
Johnny Ruffin
Justin Ruggiano

S

Jarrod Saltalamacchia
Alex Sanabia
Brian Sanches
Aníbal Sánchez
Gaby Sánchez
Jesus Sánchez
Benito Santiago
Tony Saunders
Rich Scheid
Xavier Scruggs
Rudy Seánez
Chris Seddon
Gary Sheffield
Joe Siddall
Brett Sinkbeil
Kyle Skipworth
Kevin Slowey
Aaron Small
Chuck Smith
Mark Smith
Travis Smith
Donovan Solano
Jhonatan Solano
Jorge Sosa
Justin Speier
Tim Spooneybarger
Dennis Springer
Rob Stanifer
Giancarlo Stanton
Dan Straily
Scott Strickland
Joe Strong
Larry Sutton
Ichiro Suzuki

T

Taylor Tankersley
Jesús Tavárez
Julián Tavárez
Graham Taylor
Junichi Tazawa
Michael Tejera
Tomas Telis
Nate Teut
Ryan Thompson
Joe Thurston
Ron Tingley
Chad Tracy
Matt Treanor
Ryan Tucker
Jacob Turner
Matt Turner

U

Dan Uggla
Ugueth Urbina
Jose Urena

V

Chris Valaika
Marc Valdes
Jordany Valdespin
Ismael Valdéz
Rick VandenHurk
Jason Vargas
Javier Vázquez
Gil Velazquez
José Veras
Quilvio Veras
Randy Veres
Elih Villanueva
Ron Villone
Chris Volstad
Ed Vosberg

W

Doug Waechter
Justin Wayne
David Weathers
Ryan Webb
John Wehner
Walt Weiss
Todd Wellemeyer
Sean West
Matt Whisenant
Devon White
Darrell Whitmore
Gerald Williams
Josh Willingham
Dontrelle Willis
Josh Wilson
Nigel Wilson
Preston Wilson
DeWayne Wise
Bobby Witt
Nick Wittgren
Randy Wolf
Ross Wolf
Jason Wood
Tim Wood

Y
Christian Yelich

Z

Carlos Zambrano
Mauro Zárate
Gregg Zaun
Todd Zeile
Brad Ziegler
Eddie Zosky

Roster
Major League Baseball all-time rosters